Enoch White Clark (November 16, 1802 – August 4, 1856) was the founder of E. W. Clark & Co., a prominent financial firm based in Philadelphia, Pennsylvania, that helped the U.S. government finance the Mexican–American War. In 1857, Clark was listed as one of Philadelphia's 25 millionaires. 

Clark also launched the financial career of Jay Cooke, who helped finance the Union's war effort in the Civil War and establish a true national currency.

Biography
Clark was born in November 16, 1802, in Easthampton, Massachusetts, a descendant of Captain William Clark (1609–1690), who emigrated from England aboard the ship Mary and John and landed at Plymouth, Massachusetts, in 1630, and moved to the town of Easthampton in 1639. Enoch traced his descent from William as follows: John (1651-1704), John (1679-1768), Eliakim (1707-1781), Lt. Asahel (1737-1822), to his father, Bohan (1772-1846), a merchant and miller who married Mary White (1777-?) on February 11, 1802.

Enoch Clark got his start in finance by working as an office boy at S. & M. Allen & Company, a prominent Philadelphia bank. In 1823, he was made a partner of a new branch of the bank in Providence, Rhode Island. On February 1, 1826, Clark married Sarah Crawford Dodge (1806-1878), a daughter of Nehemiah Dodge.  (After she died, her son Edward White Clark commissioned a stained-glass window in her memory in the First Unitarian Church of Philadelphia.)

In 1832, Clark launched his own bank in Boston, Massachusetts; it failed four years later, whereupon he headed back to Philadelphia.

In 1837, he created the E. W. Clark & Co. financial house with his two brothers, Luther Clapp Clark (July 4, 1815 - 1877)  and Joseph Washington Clark (1810-1892); and brother-in-law, Edward Dodge. It was described as a "general banking, commission, and exchange business."

Clark's Philadelphia firm did well, earning enough to pay off his debts in seven years, then to propel the Clarks to a place among the city's wealthiest families. The firm opened branches in New York City, St. Louis, New Orleans, and Burlington, Iowa, and made considerable money performing domestic exchanges in the wake of the 1836 revocation of the charter of the Second Bank of the United States and the Panic of 1837. Moody's magazine, a monthly publication of the Moody's credit rating agency, later wrote:During the first ten years of its development the firm gained wide recognition and public confidence, owing to the indomitable energy of Enoch W. Clark. The drafts of this house drawn between the various branches, were regarded as the very best circulating medium in the West. There were more than $2,000,000 worth of these drafts in circulation within a short time after the establishment of the western branch offices and they were considered everywhere as the equivalent of gold.Along the way, Clark hired a clerk who would one day shape the American financial system: 16-year-old Jay Cooke of Sandusky, Ohio. "Enoch W. Clark liked the boy's looks and he gave him a job. Cooke was assigned to the clerical department where his devotion to his work and his exceptional abilities in financial matters caused Mr. Clark to push him along," a 1914 history of the firm recounted. 

At the outbreak of the Mexican–American War (1846–1848), the U.S. government borrowed about $50 million (about $ today) from the firm, then recognized as "the leading domestic exchange house" in the country.

In 1849, Enoch's oldest son, Edward White Clark, became a member of the firm. That same year, Cooke was made a partner. (Cooke retired from the firm in 1854, and went on to help to sell the bonds that financed the U.S. Civil War and push the cash-strapped American government to form a true national currency.)

Enoch Clark "withdrew from the really active management" of his firm in 1850. He died on August 4, 1856, of nicotine poisoning.

Family
Enoch W. Clark was the patriarch of a family that gained much prominence in Philadelphia and national affairs. He married Sarah Crawford Dodge. Together they had at least four sons and three daughters: 
1 Edward White Clark (1828–1904). Edward married Mary Todhunter Sill (1835–1908) on July 18, 1855. They had six children:
1.1 Edward Walter Clark II (1858–1946), commodore of the Philadelphia Corinthian Yacht Club and senior partner in E.W. Clark & Co. He married Lydia Jane Clark. They had at least one child:
1.1.1 Edward Walter Clark III (1885–1939), who won golf's Presidents Cup (Harvard) in 1908.
1.2 Clarence Munroe Clark (1859–1937), U.S. tennis doubles champion, partner in E.W. Clark & Co. Married the sister of Frederick Winslow Taylor.
1.3 Joseph Sill Clark, Sr. (1861–1956), U.S. tennis champion. He married Kate Richmond Avery, sister-in-law to the inventor of Tabasco sauce, on November 26, 1896, on Avery Island, Louisiana. In 2002, Mrs. Clark's will bequeathed at least $1,671,149.67 to Harvard University. They had two sons:
1.3.1 Joseph Sill Clark, Jr. (1901–1990), mayor of Philadelphia and a U.S. Senator from Pennsylvania. Clark Jr.'s children included:
1.3.1.1 Joseph S. Clark III
1.3.1.2 Noel (Clark) Miller.
1.3.2 Avery B. Clark (d. July 14, 1957). He had at least one daughter:
1.3.2.1 Kate Avery Clark.
1.4 Herbert L. Clark (1865–1940). Partner in E.W. Clark & Co. Opposed Prohibition. His 1913 residence became the clubhouse of the Overbrook Golf Club.
1.5 Marion Clark (1867–1938). Married Louis Childs Madeira (1853–1930) in 1890. They had three children:
1.5.1 Edward W. Madeira
1.5.2 Crawford Clark Madeira (1894–1967). He married Sarah Claypool Neilson in 1918. They had three children:
1.5.2.1 Crawford Clark Madeira (1929–2009),
1.5.2.2 Harry R. Madeira
1.5.2.3 Lewis Neilson Madeira (University of Pennsylvania class of 1943, non-grad.), Cofounded Amtrol, an international manufacturer of plumbing supplies. He had at least one child:
1.5.2.1.1 Lewis Neilson Madeira, Jr. (University of Pennsylvania class of 1967), who had at least one child: 
1.5.2.1.1.1 David Clark Madeira (University of Pennsylvania class of 1989; M.G.A. 1996).
1.5.3 Elizabeth Madeira (1906–2001)
1.6 Percy Hamilton Clark (1873–1965), a top U.S. cricket player. He married Elizabeth Roberts, daughter of George Brooke Roberts, president of the Pennsylvania Railroad. They had at least one child:
1.6.1 Mary Todhunter "Tod" Clark (1907–1999), who in 1930 married the future New York governor and U.S. vice president Nelson Rockefeller. They had five children. They divorced in 1962, which was considered to have hurt Nelson's 1964 bid to become the GOP's candidate for U.S. president.
1.6.1.1 Rodman Rockefeller
1.6.1.2 Anne Rockefeller
1.6.1.3 Steven Clark Rockefeller
1.6.1.4 and .5 twins Michael Clark Rockefeller and Mary Rockefeller.
2 Sarah Crawford Clark (1832-1835). Buried in North Burial Ground in Providence, Rhode Island.
3 Clarence Howard Clark, Sr. (1833–1906). Clarence Clark married Amie Hampton Wescott, who died in 1870 during childbirth. They had at least one child:
3.1 Clarence Howard Clark, Jr. (1862–1916).
In 1873, he married Marie Motley Davis and they had a son:
3.2 Charles Clark III. Married Eleanor Townsend Clark (1899-1981), with whom he had two daughters and a son:
3.2.1 Eleanor Yerkes
3.2.2 daughter, name unknown
3.2.3 Clarence H. Clark IV, who served in the Army Air Corps during World War II and married Jean E. Clark. They had a son and a daughter:
3.2.3.1 Clarence H. Clark V, who married Kathleen, and had a son and a daughter:
3.2.3.1.1 Clarence H. "Chip" Clark VI
3.2.3.1.2 Betsy Clark
3.2.3.2 Amy Clark (d. 2012). 
4 J. Hinckley Clark (ca. 1835-1889). Became partner in E.W. Clark & Co. in 1872.
5 Frank Hamilton Clark (1844-1882). Banker, president of the Lake Superior and Mississippi Railroad.
6 Sarah Crawford Clark (?-?): Married Alfred Zantzinger, with whom she had one son:
6.1 Clarence Clark Zantzinger (1872-1954), an architect and public servant in Philadelphia.
7 Mary White Clark (Sept. 6, 1842-1926): Married John Appleton Burnham (?-1910) in 1842. They had at least two daughters and a son:
7.2 Helen Clark Burnham (born in Massachusetts).
7.3 Mary Crawford Burnham
7.4 John Appleton Burnham

References

External links
Memorial Hospital & Sloan-Kettering Institute

1802 births
1856 deaths
People from Easthampton, Massachusetts
Clark banking family
American people of English descent
E. W. Clark & Co.
Deaths from sepsis
American financiers
19th-century American businesspeople